Diana is a 2013 biographical drama film directed by Oliver Hirschbiegel, about the last two years of the life of Diana, Princess of Wales. The screenplay is based on Kate Snell's 2001 book, Diana: Her Last Love, and was written by Stephen Jeffreys. British actress Naomi Watts plays the title role of Diana.

The world premiere of the film was held in London on 5 September 2013. It was released in the UK on 20 September 2013. The film received negative reviews from both British and American critics.

Plot
The film depicts the last two years of the princess's life, beginning with events when Diana (Naomi Watts) divorces Charles, Prince of Wales.  She meets and falls in love with Pakistani heart surgeon Hasnat Khan (Naveen Andrews). The film depicts her tours of Angola in her campaign against the use of land mines. Trips to advance causes in  Australia, Pakistan, New York City, Bosnia, Italy, and ultimately, Paris are also shown, with recreations of what she wore in real life. Her relationship with Dr. Khan ends due to his desire for a private life and objections to her celebrity status. The film depicts Diana's affair with Anglo-Egyptian billionaire Dodi Fayed as a calculated attempt to make Dr. Khan jealous, but it ends with the car crash that killed Diana, Fayed, and their driver in the Pont de l'Alma Tunnel in Paris – however, there is no re-enactment of the crash scene.

Cast
 Naomi Watts as Diana, Princess of Wales
 Naveen Andrews as Dr. Hasnat Khan
 Cas Anvar as Dodi Fayed
 Laurence Belcher as Prince William
 Harry Holland as Prince Harry
 Douglas Hodge as Paul Burrell
 Geraldine James as Oonagh Toffolo
 Charles Edwards as Patrick Jephson
 Mary Stockley as Assistant
 Juliet Stevenson as Sonia

Production
The screenplay, which is based on Kate Snell's 2001 book, Diana: Her Last Love, was written by Stephen Jeffreys. Robert Bernstein and Douglas Rae produced the movie for Ecosse Films.

Key scenes involving Diana and Dodi Fayed on his family yacht, Jonikal, were filmed on the 45m luxury charter yacht Princess Iolanthe. The opening and closing scenes at the Paris Ritz Imperial Suite were filmed at Fetcham Park House in Fetcham, Surrey.

Reception
The film has received overwhelmingly negative reviews. On review aggregator Rotten Tomatoes, it has an 8% approval rating based on reviews from 97 critics and an average score of 3.5/10. The consensus states: "Naomi Watts tries hard in the title role, but Diana buries her efforts under a shoddy script and clumsy direction." On Metacritic, the film has a 35 (out of 100), based on 28 reviews.

David Edwards from The Mirror said it was a "cheap and cheerless effort that looks like a Channel 5 mid-week matinee" and that "Wesley Snipes in a blonde wig would be more convincing", awarding the film one star out of five. Peter Bradshaw of The Guardian also awarded it one star out of five and called the film "car crash cinema".

Joshua Rothkopf of Time Out New York called Watts's performance "extraordinary" and gave the film 3 stars out of 5, calling it "a restrained biopic that affords its subject the romantic privacy that life denied her." Nigel Andrews of the Financial Times said that "once again Watts supplies the wattage" but that her performance is "frighteningly isolated... the compensating passion in a torpid drama." Jim Schembri of 3AW praised Watts' "impressive performance" but remarked that the film "could actually have done with another half-hour putting more meat onto the bones of these underdeveloped chapters of her story. " Dominic Corry of flicks.co.nz called the film "bad in the blandest way possible" and lamented that "Watts is let down by the Mills & Boon-level script". Fionnuala Halligan of Screen Daily also criticised the writing, saying that Watts' "brave performance should not be under-estimated given the poverty of the dialogue and the pressure of the part."

Naomi Watts received a Razzie Award nomination for Worst Actress for her work in both this film and Movie 43, where she lost to Tyler Perry for his performance in drag in A Madea Christmas.

Soundtrack

References

External links
 
 
 

2013 films
2013 biographical drama films
2013 independent films
2013 romantic drama films
Belgian biographical drama films
Belgian independent films
Belgian romantic drama films
British biographical drama films
British independent films
British romantic drama films
English-language French films
English-language Belgian films
English-language Swedish films
Film controversies
Film controversies in the United Kingdom
Films about Diana, Princess of Wales
Films set in 1996
Films set in 1997
Films set in London
Films shot in London
Films about interracial romance
Films directed by Oliver Hirschbiegel
Fiction with unreliable narrators
French biographical drama films
French independent films
French romantic drama films
Swedish biographical drama films
Swedish independent films
Swedish romantic drama films
Films scored by David Holmes (musician)
Biographical films about English royalty
2010s English-language films
2010s British films
2010s French films
2010s Swedish films